Gozo Region is one of five regions of Malta. The region includes the islands of Gozo, Comino and several little islets such as Cominotto. The region does not border with any other regions, but it is close to the Northern Region.

The region was created by the Local Councils Act of 1993. It is the only original region still in existence, since the other two (Malta Majjistral and Malta Xlokk) were split into smaller regions by Act No. XVI of 2009.

Subdivision

Districts
The region corresponds to Gozo and Comino statistical district.

Local councils
Gozo region includes 14 local councils:
 Fontana
 Għajnsielem – include the areas of Mġarr, Gozo, Fort Chambray and Comino. 
 Għarb – include the areas of Ta' Pinu, Birbuba and Santu Pietru 
 Għasri – include the area of Għammar and Wied il-Għasri
 Kerċem – include the area of Santa Luċija
 Munxar – include the area of Xlendi 
 Nadur – include the areas of Daħlet Qorrot, San Blas, Nadur, Ta' Kuxxina and Ta' Kenuna 
 Qala – include the area of Ħondoq ir-Rummien 
 San Lawrenz – include the areas of Ta' Dbieġi and Dwejra
 Sannat – include the areas of  Mġarr ix-Xini, Ta' Ċenċ and Ta' Saguna
 Rabat (Victoria) – include the areas of Taċ-Ċawla and Ċittadella
 Xagħra – include the area of Ramla Bay 
 Xewkija – include the area of Tal-Barmil 
 Żebbuġ – include the areas of Marsalforn and Qbajjar

Hamlets
 Marsalforn
 Santa Luċija
 Xlendi

Regional Committee
The current Gozo Regional Committee was created by Act No. XVI of 2009, and was formally constituted in 2012. It is made up of:

The Gozo Regional Committee is housed in the Banca Giuratale.

References

Regions of Malta
Region
States and territories established in 1993
1993 establishments in Malta